Hayfield is an unincorporated community in Frederick County, Virginia. Hayfield is located west of Winchester on the Northwestern Turnpike (US 50) at its crossroads with North and South Hayfield Roads (SR 600) between Flint Ridge and Hogue Creek. A post office has been established here since 1867. The community's Hayfield School was in operation from 1920 to 1942.

Historic sites
Hayfield School
Mount Olive Church

External links

Tour of Hayfield, Virginia

Unincorporated communities in Frederick County, Virginia
Northwestern Turnpike
Unincorporated communities in Virginia